Yuca con mojo is a Cuban side dish made by marinating yuca root (also known as cassava) in garlic, lime, and olive oil. Often, onions are included in the marinade. Also known as one of Cuba's national dishes.

Latin American cuisine
Cuban cuisine